Charles de Chambrun may refer to:

Charles de Chambrun (1827–1880), French politician of the Pineton de Chambrun family
Charles de Chambrun (1875–1952), French diplomat, writer and member of the Académie française
Charles de Chambrun (1930–2010), French politician of the Pineton de Chambrun family, secretary of state for foreign commerce 1966–7, mayor of Saint-Gilles 1989–92